The National Wilderness Preservation System includes 803 wilderness areas protecting  of federal land . They are managed by four agencies:

United States National Park Service (NPS)
United States Forest Service (USFS)
United States Fish and Wildlife Service (FWS)
United States Bureau of Land Management (BLM)

These wilderness areas cover about 4.5% of the United States' land area, an area larger than the state of California. They are located in 44 states (excepting Connecticut, Delaware, Iowa, Kansas, Maryland, and Rhode Island) and Puerto Rico.

The USFS oversees  of wilderness areas in 447 areas. BLM oversees  at 224 sites. Some wilderness areas are managed by multiple agencies.

Some areas are designated wilderness by state or tribal governments. These are not governed by the Federal National Wilderness Preservation System.

This table lists all U.S. areas that have been designated by the United States Congress under the Wilderness Act. The designation date is the date that the wilderness was signed into law. Some areas have been expanded or otherwise changed since their original designation.

See also
Wilderness area
List of U.S. National Forests
List of U.S. National Parks
United States National Monument
Intact forest landscape

External links
16 U.S. Code § 1132.Extent of System
U.S. Department of Interior webpage on public lands
U.S. Bureau of Land Management webpage on wilderness areas
U.S. Fish and Wildlife Service webpage on wilderness areas
U.S. National Park Service webpage on wilderness areas
U.S. Forest Service webpage on wilderness areas
Wilderness Connect
Map of Wilderness Areas

 
Wilderness
IUCN Category Ib